Manilkara decrescens is a species of plant in the family Sapotaceae. It is endemic to Brazil, and is threatened by habitat loss.

References

decrescens
Plants described in 1990
Endangered plants
Flora of Brazil
Taxonomy articles created by Polbot